Brian Aspen (born 6 April 1959) is a male retired British wrestler.

Wrestling career
He competed at the 1980 Summer Olympics and the 1984 Summer Olympics. He appeared in four Commonwealth Games winning three medals. The first medal (a bronze) came representing England in the 62 kg featherweight division, at the 1978 Commonwealth Games in Edmonton, Alberta, Canada. Four years later he won a gold medal representing England and in the 57 kg bantamweight division, at the 1982 Commonwealth Games in Brisbane, Queensland, Australia. The third medal (another bronze) was at the 1986 Commonwealth Games in Edinburgh and a fourth Games appearance was at the 1994 Commonwealth Games, where he finished in seventh place.

References

External links
 

1959 births
Living people
British male sport wrestlers
Olympic wrestlers of Great Britain
Wrestlers at the 1980 Summer Olympics
Wrestlers at the 1984 Summer Olympics
Sportspeople from Bolton
Wrestlers at the 1978 Commonwealth Games
Wrestlers at the 1982 Commonwealth Games
Wrestlers at the 1986 Commonwealth Games
Wrestlers at the 1994 Commonwealth Games
Commonwealth Games gold medallists for England
Commonwealth Games bronze medallists for England
Commonwealth Games medallists in wrestling
Medallists at the 1978 Commonwealth Games
Medallists at the 1982 Commonwealth Games
Medallists at the 1986 Commonwealth Games